Liz Janean Marek (born October 26, 1980) is an American cake decorator and teacher known for her elaborate sculpted cakes. She is the founder of Artisan Cake Company based in Portland, Oregon and online cake decorating school "Sugar Geek Show".

Life and career
Marek went to Linn–Benton Community College majoring in graphic design. After a short career in graphic design, she decided to look into other creative fields. In 2007 she started cake decorating as a hobby.

In 2009, Marek founded the Artisan Cake Company in Portland, Oregon.

In 2014, Marek published her first cake decorating book, Artisan Cake Company’s Visual Guide to Cake Decorating. She also took a decision to close her public bakery and focus her attention on teaching others.

In 2015, Marek and her husband Dan opened her online school, Sugar Geek Show through which she teaches new techniques and processes involved in cake production and decoration.

Marek has been featured in various editions of American Cake Decorators Magazine, Cake Masters Magazine USA, Cake Central Magazine, and other related publications.

Marek is an alumnus of Oregon Culinary Institute. She has competed and won in several cake making shows and food network competitions across the US and beyond.

Awards and honors
 2017 - Top 10 Cake Artists by Cake Masters Magazine USA

 2018 - Nominated to represent the US in the 2019 World Cake Designers Championship

Personal life
Liz is married with 2 children.

References

External links
 Artisan Cake Company website
 Sugar Geek Show  website

Living people
American women company founders
American company founders
American designers
Businesspeople from Portland, Oregon
1980 births
21st-century American women